Route 133 is a highway in central Missouri.  Its northern terminus is at U.S. Route 63 near Westphalia; its southern terminus is at Interstate 44 about fourteen miles (21 km) west of Waynesville.

Highway 133 passes through Richland, where the highway intersects with Route 7.

Major intersections

References

133
Transportation in Pulaski County, Missouri
Transportation in Laclede County, Missouri
Transportation in Maries County, Missouri
Transportation in Osage County, Missouri